The 2007 UCI Track Cycling World Championships is the World Championship for track cycling. It took place in Palma de Mallorca, Spain from March 29, 2007 to April 1, 2007. The event was dominated by the Great Britain team who topped the medals table, winning seven of the seventeen gold medals on offer.

The 2007 programme comprised 17 events, including the 10 Olympic events, and was also the first time that the multi-disciplinary Omnium – a cycling equivalent to the athletics pentathlon consisting of 5 events – was contested.

Medal table

Medal summary

References
Results book
2007 UCI Track Cycling World Championships – CM Spain, March 29-April 1, 2007 Cycling News

See also
2007 in track cycling

 
Uci Track Cycling World Championships, 2007
UCI Track Cycling World Championships by year
Cycling competitions in Spain
2007 in Spanish sport
March 2007 sports events in Europe
April 2007 sports events in Europe